Kierra is the sixth studio album by American singer Kierra Sheard. It was released by Karew Records and RCA Inspiration on April 17, 2020. Sheard is Also nominated for a Grammy award at the 2021 ceremony.

Critical reception
Allmusic editor Marcy Donelson found that Kierra "is an effervescent one, filled with exuberant, urban-influenced gospel tunes [...] Songs called "Beautiful," "Grateful," and "BIG BIG BIG" capture the uplifting spirit of the album, which closes with "So into You," featuring Sheard's nephew Jacob Sheard."

Track listing

Notes
 signifies a co-producer

Charts

Weekly charts

Year-end charts

References

Kierra Sheard albums
2020 albums
Urban contemporary gospel albums